Lancaster School is a preserved 1881 two-story schoolhouse located in rural Keokuk County, Iowa, United States southeast of the county seat of Sigourney.

History
Lancaster School is the last remaining public building in what was the former county seat of Lancaster. It occupies the ground that was the courthouse square. The school was one of six two-story buildings built by the county for educational purposes in the 1870s and early 1880s. They required two teachers, and were therefore more expensive to operate. This building was constructed in 1881 by Reynolds Bros. It replaced a school building that had been built further east in 1874. It is a two-story frame structure that measures . The pedimented entry faces the south, and there is a belfry above the gable.  A single classroom is located on the northern two-thirds of both floors. The town of Lancaster at one time had 32 buildings, but it started to decline in the 20th century. Enrollment in the school was 119 in 1898, but fell to about thirty early in the 20th century. When it closed in 1964 there were 13 students enrolled, and by that time they only utilized the first floor. The former school building, one of the churches and a few houses are all that remain of Lancaster. The building has been used in subsequent years as a voting facility. It was listed on the National Register of Historic Places in 1984.

References

School buildings completed in 1881
Defunct schools in Iowa
National Register of Historic Places in Keokuk County, Iowa
Bungalow architecture in Iowa
Colonial Revival architecture in Iowa
School buildings on the National Register of Historic Places in Iowa
1881 establishments in Iowa